Anjin is the Japanese word for pilot (of ships, airplanes and similar things). It may also refer to:
Anjin Miura, an honorific name given to the sailor William Adams (1564-1620)
The name given to the character Blackthorne in James Clavell's Shōgun (novel)